Francis Blackburn Posey (April 28, 1848 – October 31, 1915) was an American lawyer who served for five weeks as a member of the United States House of Representatives from Indiana in 1889.

Biography
Francis B. Posey was born in Petersburg, Indiana on April 28, 1848, the son of John Wesley Posey and Sarah Blackburn Posey.

He attended Asbury College for one year, and earned a law degree at Indiana University Maurer School of Law in 1869. He married Emma Brown on January 17, 1878, and they had four children, one of whom was John Adams Posey.

Congress 
He served in the U.S. Congress from  January 29, 1889, to March 3, 1889.  He was elected to fill the vacancy created by the resignation of Alvin P. Hovey, who had been elected Governor of Indiana.  Posey was defeated for re-election to the U.S. Congress.  He also ran unsuccessfully for other offices, including the Indiana state Senate.  Posey was also an elector on the James Garfield ticket in 1880.

Death
Francis B. Posey died at his home in Rockport, Indiana on October 31, 1915. He was buried at Walnut Hill Cemetery (Petersburg, Indiana).

References

External links

 

1848 births
1915 deaths
Indiana University Maurer School of Law alumni
1880 United States presidential electors
19th-century American politicians

Republican Party members of the United States House of Representatives from Indiana